Eberhard Herz is a German-American former soccer player who played as a forward and earned one cap with the U.S. national team in a 3-3 World Cup qualification tie with Mexico on November 11, 1960.

In 1953, Herz played a half season for TSV 1860 München before immigrating to New York in 1954.  There, he played for S.C. Eintracht of the German-American Soccer League, winning the 1955 National Challenge Cup over the Los Angeles Danish Americans. Herz later played for the Los Angeles Kickers, scoring in the 1960 National Challenge Cup final loss to the New York Ukrainian Nationals.

References

External links

American soccer players
German footballers
German emigrants to the United States
German-American Soccer League players
Los Angeles Kickers players
Living people
TSV 1860 Munich players
United States men's international soccer players
German footballers needing infoboxes
Association football forwards
Year of birth missing (living people)